The Virginia Tech Hokies Women's Basketball team represents Virginia Tech in women's basketball. The school competes in the Atlantic Coast Conference in Division I of the National Collegiate Athletic Association (NCAA). They are currently coached by Kenny Brooks. The Hokies play home basketball games at Cassell Coliseum in Blacksburg, Virginia.

Season-by-season record
As of the 2015–16 season, the Hokies have a 622–546 all-time record, with 9 appearances in the NCAA Tournament. They played in the Metro Conference from the 1981–82 season to the 1994–95 season. They played in the Atlantic 10 Conference from the 1995–96 season to the 1999–00 season. They played in the Big East Conference from the 2000–01 season to the 2003–04 season. They have played in the Atlantic Coast Conference since the 2004–05 season.

NCAA tournament results

References

External links